Pantokrator may refer to:

Christ Pantocrator, a specific depiction of Christ in Christian iconography
Mount Pantokrator, Corfu, Greece
Pantokratoros monastery, Greece
Pantokrator (band), a Christian metal band from Sweden
Pantokrator, former church Zeyrek Mosque, Turkey